Paule is both a feminine given name and a surname. Notable people with the name include:

Given name:
Paule Andral (1879–1956), French actress
Paule Baillargeon (born 1945), Canadian actress and film director
Paule Baudouin (born 1984), French handball player
Paule Brunelle (born 1953), Canadian politician
Paule Constable, British lighting designer
Paule Constant (born 1944), French novelist
Paule Desjardins, French singer
Paule Gauthier (c.1943–2016), Canadian lawyer
Paule Herreman (1919–1991), Belgian actress and television presenter
Paule Marrot (1902–1987), French textile designer
Paule Marshall (1929–2019), American novelist (born Valenza Pauline Burke)
Paule Maurice (1910–1967), French composer
Paule Mink (1839–1901), French feminist and socialist
Paule Vézelay (1892–1984), British painter
 Paule du Bouchet (born 1951), French writer and novelist

Surname:
Antoine de Paule (c.1551–1636), French Grandmaster of the Order of Saint John
Anthony Paule (born 1956), American blues guitarist and singer
Ross Paule (born 1976), American soccer player
Tove Paule (born 1951), Norwegian sports official

French feminine given names